This list of bridges in the Netherlands lists bridges of particular historical, scenic, architectural or engineering interest in the Netherlands. Road and railway bridges, viaducts, aqueducts and footbridges are included.

Historical and architectural interest bridges

Major road and railway bridges

Notes and references 
 

 

 Others references

See also 

 :nl:Lijst van spoorbruggen in Nederland  - List of railway bridges in the Netherlands
 Lijst van bruggen in Amsterdam, Amsterdam-Noord, Arnhem, Delft (centrum), Den Haag, Groningen (stad), Harlingen, Heerenveen, Hoorn, Leeuwarden, Nijmegen, Rotterdam, Sneek  - List of bridges by city.
 Lijst van bruggen over de Amsterdam-Rijnkanaal, Apeldoorns Kanaal, Rijn-Schiekanaal, Drentsche Hoofdvaart, Gelderse IJssel, Hollandse IJssel, Julianakanaal, Oude Rijn, Gouwe, Maas, Máximakanaal, Merwedekanaal, Noord-Willemskanaal, Noordhollandsch Kanaal, Overijsselse Vecht, Ringvaart, Rotte, Ruiten-Aa-kanaal, chelde-Rijnkanaal, Twentekanalen, Utrechtse Vecht, Waal, Wilhelminakanaal  - List of bridges by river.
 Transport in the Netherlands
 Rail transport in the Netherlands
 List of motorways in the Netherlands
 Geography of the Netherlands

External links

Further reading 
 

Netherlands
 
Bridges
Bridges